Fredericksburg may refer to:

Places

United States
Fredericksburg, California
Fredericksburg, Indiana
Fredericksburg, Iowa
Fredericksburg, Missouri
Fredericksburg, Ohio, a village in Wayne County
Fredericksburg, Mahoning County, Ohio, an unincorporated community
Fredericksburg, Pennsylvania (disambiguation), various places
Fredericksburg, Texas
Fredericksburg, Virginia, a historic city in north central Virginia
Battle of Fredericksburg, a major battle of the American Civil War which took place there
Second Battle of Fredericksburg, another battle of the American Civil War that took place there

Canada
Fredericksburg, Ontario, the former name for Delhi, Ontario

Ships
 , several ships
 CSS Fredericksburg, an ironclad of the Confederate States Navy during the American Civil War

See also
Frederiksberg, Denmark